Tom Clancy's Splinter Cell: Essentials is an action-adventure video game with heavy emphasis on stealth. It is part of the Splinter Cell series and was released for the PlayStation Portable handheld system. It was developed by Ubisoft Montreal and published by Ubisoft on March 21, 2006. It is the fourth entry in the series and runs on the Unreal Engine 2.

Development 
Ubisoft Montreal had been in development of Splinter Cell: Essentials from at least 2005, with Ubisoft Montreal officially announcing the game on January 12, 2006. Once announced, Ubisoft Montreal provided additional details regarding the gameplay, story and more as it was scheduled for spring of 2006. Following the announcement, previews of the game were shown to journalists as more info regarding specific missions and returning features from the classic Splinter Cell series were included in the game. It was revealed that Ubisoft Montreal utilized the Unreal Engine 2 for Essentials, but toned down to run properly on the PlayStation Portable.

Plot 
In January 2009, Sam Fisher, a former NSA agent-turned-fugitive, sneaks into a Washington, D.C. cemetery where his daughter, Sarah, who has been recently killed in a car accident, is buried. Fisher is arrested at this grave site, taken into custody and interrogated at the NSA's headquarters in Fort Meade, Maryland. During this time, Sam recalls past events, that are then played as missions.

In the end, Sam admits that he did kill his Third Echelon handler, Colonel Irving Lambert. In the final mission, Sam steals the evidence and escapes from the NSA headquarters where he was being held.

Reception 

Critical reaction to Splinter Cell: Essentials was mixed. GameRankings gave it a score of 58.22%, while Metacritic gave it 58 out of 100.

Juan Castro of IGN gave the game a score of 6.3 out of 10, saying: "It feels rushed, even slightly broken during certain parts. Beyond this, the game plays as though it doesn't belong on the PSP. It yearns for a second analog stick and an extra pair of buttons, for instance. Not only that, it suffers quite a bit in the performance department—you'll rarely see the game running smoothly. Making matters worse is that Essentials doesn't look all that spectacular. This from a series that always pushes the boundaries of current technology."

Greg Mueller of GameSpot gave Essentials a score of 5.8 out of 10, saying: "Splinter Cell: Essentials sounds like a fine idea. Take some missions from previous games, mix them up a little, add some entirely new missions, and fit it all onto the PSP. Unfortunately, due to some bad controls, oppressively dark levels, and a worthless multiplayer mode, the result is a game that is more frustrating than it is rewarding."

References

External links 
 Official Splinter Cell website
 

2006 video games
Action-adventure games
PlayStation Portable games
PlayStation Portable-only games
Essentials
Stealth video games
Tom Clancy games
Ubisoft games
Unreal Engine games
Video games about the United States Navy SEALs
Video games developed in Canada
Video games set in 1992
Video games set in 2004
Video games set in 2009
Video games set in Azerbaijan
Video games set in Colombia
Video games set in France
Video games set in Indiana
Video games set in Indonesia
Video games set in Kansas
Video games set in Maryland
Video games set in New Orleans
Video games set in New York City
Video games set in Serbia
Video games set in Washington, D.C.
Video games set in Belgrade